Clayton Andrew Hebenton (born February 20, 1953) is a Canadian retired professional ice hockey goaltender.

Born in Victoria, British Columbia, Hebenton was drafted 99th overall by the Vancouver Canucks in the 1973 NHL Amateur Draft but never played in the National Hockey League. He played two seasons in the World Hockey Association with the Phoenix Roadrunners.

He is the son of Andy Hebenton, who played 630 consecutive games in the National Hockey League for the New York Rangers and the Boston Bruins.

External links

1953 births
Living people
Albuquerque Six-Guns players
Baltimore Clippers (1979–81) players
Binghamton Dusters players
Canadian ice hockey goaltenders
Houston Apollos players
Ice hockey people from British Columbia
Phoenix Roadrunners (WHA) players
San Diego Mariners (PHL) players
Sportspeople from Victoria, British Columbia
Syracuse Firebirds players
Tucson Mavericks players
Vancouver Canucks draft picks
Canadian expatriate ice hockey players in the United States